Black Titan, is a public artwork by American artist John Spaulding, located on the grounds of the Indianapolis Art Center, which is in Indianapolis, Indiana, United States.

Background

Before the piece was installed at the Indianapolis Art Center, it was exhibited at shows in New York, followed by Indiana Black Expo in 1985 and The Children's Museum of Indianapolis. Artist John Spaulding originally wanted the sculpture to depict a 16-foot-tall boxer. However, the proposed piece was too expensive, so he created a bust of a boxer, instead. The sculpture took one year to create.

Description

The sculpture is a cast bronze bust of a black boxer in his early twenties. His features are dramatic - bulging eyes, a large nose, and large ears. His hair is short and cropped. The bust sits upon a concrete base (approx. 37 × 40½ × 54 inches).

The sculpture's concrete base has an inscription reading: By/John/Spaulding.

Location Information

The Indianapolis Art Center owns the piece which is part of the center's ARTSPARK. The ARTSPARK was designed by Michael Graves with the intention of melding art creation with outdoor gallery space.

The Indianapolis Art Center began in 1934 as the Indianapolis Art League. It moved to the Broad Ripple Village neighborhood north of downtown Indianapolis in 1976. In 1994 the name was changed to the Indianapolis Art Center in order to demonstrate the organization's philosophy of inclusion.

Broad Ripple is one of six areas designated as cultural districts in Indianapolis. The neighborhood is known for being socially and ethnically diverse and supportive of art and culture.

See also

Untitled (Jazz Musicians) by Spaulding
Jammin' on the Avenue by Spaulding

References

External links
Black Titan on Flickr

1985 sculptures
African-American art
Black people in art
Bronze sculptures in Indiana
Busts in Indiana
Indianapolis Art Center artworks
Outdoor sculptures in Indianapolis
Sculptures of men in Indiana